Benjamin F. Sherman (November 30, 1836 – October 9, 1915) was a member of the Wisconsin State Assembly and the Wisconsin State Senate.

Biography
Sherman was born on November 30, 1836 in Ann Arbor, Michigan. He later moved to Beaver Dam, Wisconsin, where he edited and published the Beaver Dam Argus. He died in Beaver Dam in 1915.

Sherman married Martha E. Schuart (1840–1917), and he was the father of James B. Sherman (1880–1955), who edited the Beaver Dam Argus from 1927 to 1950.

Career
Sherman was a member of the Assembly in 1880. He later represented the 13th District during the 1883 and 1885 sessions. In addition, Sherman was Chairman of the Dodge County, Wisconsin Board of Supervisors from 1880 to 1884. He was a Democrat.

References

External links

1836 births
1915 deaths
Politicians from Ann Arbor, Michigan
Politicians from Beaver Dam, Wisconsin
Democratic Party Wisconsin state senators
Democratic Party members of the Wisconsin State Assembly
County supervisors in Wisconsin